The Lô River is a major river of Vietnam. It flows through Hà Giang Province, Tuyên Quang Province  and Phú Thọ Province for 470 kilometres and has a basin area of 39,000 km² and originates in Yunnan, China.

References

Rivers of Hà Giang province
Rivers of Tuyên Quang province
Rivers of Phú Thọ province
Rivers of Vietnam